Daniel Kemp may refer to:

Daniel Kemp (actor) (1927–2000), American actor
Daniel S. Kemp (1936–2020), American organic chemist
Daniel Kemp (footballer), English footballer for Leyton Orient

See also
John Dan Kemp (born c. 1951), Arkansas Supreme Court Chief Justice